Barjon is a commune in the Côte-d'Or department in the Bourgogne-Franche-Comté region of eastern France.

The inhabitants of the commune are known as Barjonais.

Geography
Barjon is located on the southern flank of Mont Mercure (469 m) at an altitude of 397 metres at the town hall. It is some 40 km south-west of Langres and 40 km north by north-west of Dijon.
Access to the commune is by the D19 road from Salives in the west which passes through the village and continues east to Avot.  The D19E goes north from the village to join the D190 on the northern border of the commune.

The commune is forested in the southern arm with the centre of the commune farmland and a band of forest around its borders.

La Tille stream forms the south-western border of the commune as it flows east across the "neck" of the commune then forms part of the eastern border before continuing east to join La Creuse at Avot. La Tille de Barjon rises just east of the commune and flows south near the eastern border to join La Tille. Le Volgrain stream rises north-west of the commune and flows south down the western side of the commune and joins La Tille just south-west of the village.

History
After the raids by the Saracens on Autun and the sacking of the village by Anbasa ibn Suhaym Al-Kalbi on 22 August 725, Saint Frodulphe de Barjon, the Abbot of Saint Martin, retired as a hermit to Barjon.

Barjon appears as Barjon on the 1750 Cassini Map and the same on the 1790 version.

Heraldry

Administration

List of Successive Mayors

Demography
In 2017 the commune had 41 inhabitants.

Culture and heritage

Religious heritage
The commune has a Cemetery Cross (15th century) which is registered as an historical monument.

The Church contains several items that are registered as historical objects:
A Statue: Saint John the Evangelist (17th century)
A Statue: Saint Madeleine (16th century)
A Group Sculpture: Virgin of Pity (17th century)
The Sarcophagus of Saint Frodulphe (8th century)
A Statue: Saint Benigne (15th century)
A Shrine to Saint Frodulphe (17th century)
A Shrine to Saint Frodulphe (17th century)
A Statue: Saint Roch (17th century)
A Statue: Saint Frodulphe (17th century)

See also
Communes of the Côte-d'Or department

References

Communes of Côte-d'Or